Governor Abercromby may refer to:

John Abercromby (British Army officer) (1772–1817), Acting Governor of Madras in 1913
Ralph Abercromby (1734–1801), Governor of Trinidad in 1797
Robert Abercromby of Airthrey (1740–1827), Governor of Bombay from 1790 to 1792

See also
Neil Abercrombie (born 1938), 7th Governor of Hawaii